New Halfa Airport  is an airport serving New Halfa, located in the state of Kassala in Sudan.

Facilities

References

External links
 

Airports in Sudan
Kassala (state)